Austin Martz (born May 31, 1992) is a former American soccer player.

College career 

Martz spent his entire college career at  Georgetown University. He made a total of 74 appearances for the Hoyas.

He appeared for Premier Development League side Baltimore Bohemians in 2013, 2014 and 2015.

Professional career 

After various trials, including one at New York Red Bulls II and spells in Scandinavia, Martz signed with Maltese Premier League side Pembroke Athleta in August 2015.

Martz signed with United Soccer League (USL) side Wilmington Hammerheads on February 9, 2016. Martz joined USL side Orlando City B on December 6, 2016. Martz joined USL side Saint Louis FC on December 12, 2017.

References

External links 

 Hoyas bio
 

1992 births
Living people
American soccer players
Georgetown Hoyas men's soccer players
Baltimore Bohemians players
Pembroke Athleta F.C. players
Wilmington Hammerheads FC players
Orlando City B players
Association football midfielders
Soccer players from Pennsylvania
USL League Two players
USL Championship players
American expatriate soccer players
People from Mechanicsburg, Pennsylvania
Expatriate footballers in Malta
Saint Louis FC players